Jesse Murdock, Jr. (September 17, 1938 – September 25, 1965) was an American collegiate and Professional Football player. After graduating from California Western University he served in the United States Marine Corps (1958 to 1961), then tried out for the American Football League's San Diego Chargers in 1963.  After being released by the Chargers' Sid Gillman during training camp, he played for the AFL's Oakland Raiders and Buffalo Bills in the 1963 AFL season.

Murdock was killed in an automobile accident on September 25, 1965, and was buried with full military honors at the Golden Gate National Cemetery, San Bruno, California.

See also
 List of American Football League players

Oakland Raiders players
Buffalo Bills players
Alliant International University alumni
1938 births
1965 deaths
Burials at Golden Gate National Cemetery
American Football League players
United States Marines
Road incident deaths in the United States